Uilliam Ó Fearghail (died 1516) was a Roman Catholic prelate: he served as Bishop of Ardagh (1480–1516).

Biography
Uilliam Ó Fearghail was ordained a priest in the Order of Cistercians. On 4 Aug 1480, Uilliam Ó Fearghail was appointed by Pope Sixtus IV as Bishop of Ardagh. He was consecrated bishop on 11 August 1482. He served as Bishop of Ardagh until his death in 1516. While bishop, he served as principal co-consecrator of Michael Hildebrand, Archbishop of Riga (1484).

References 

1516 deaths
16th-century Roman Catholic bishops in Ireland
Bishops appointed by Pope Sixtus IV
Cistercian bishops
15th-century Roman Catholic bishops in Ireland